Pete is a surname of Dutch & Hungarian origins. Notable people with the name include:

Eric Pete, American author
Hazel Pete (1914–2003), Native American basket weaver
Lawrence Pete (born 1966), American football player
Lee Pete (1924–2010), American sports-talk radio broadcaster and college athlete
Megan Pete or Megan Thee Stallion (born 1995), American rapper
Rémi Pété (born 1987), French male canoeist

See also
Peet § Surname
Peete, surname

References